Abuelhawa v. United States, 556 U.S. 816 (2009), was a United States Supreme Court case in which the Court held that a defendant who used a cellphone for the misdemeanor purchase of cocaine could not be charged with a felony for using a "communication facility" to facilitate the distribution of an illegal drug under 21 U.S.C. § 843(b). In a unanimous opinion delivered by Justice Souter, the Court reasoned that the Government's interpretation of "facilitate" exposed a first-time buyer using a phone "to punishment 12 times more severe than a purchase by a recidivist offender and 8 times more severe than the unauthorized possession of a drug used by rapists," and was clearly not in line with Congress's intent, since it conflicted with the classification of the drug sale itself as a misdemeanor.

References

External links
 
 Text of appealed-from opinion by the Court of Appeals for the Fourth Circuit

United States Supreme Court cases
United States Supreme Court cases of the Roberts Court
2009 in United States case law